The Spalding World Tour was a baseball tournament financed by the sports company Spalding.
 
The tour began in October 1888 to April 1889, the baseball tour group travelled to Egypt, Italy, France, England, Ireland and the United States.

The purpose of the world tour was to promote the sport of Baseball nationally across the United States and globally.

References

Bibliography 
 Mark Lamster, Spalding's World Tour: The Epic Adventure that Took Baseball Around the Globe - And Made It America's Game, PublicAffairs, 2006, 368 p. 

International baseball